Prince Emili (born September 18, 1998) is an American football defensive tackle for the New Orleans Saints of the National Football League (NFL).  He played college football at Penn.

Professional career

Buffalo Bills
Emili was signed by the Buffalo Bills on May 2, 2022, as an undrafted free agent. He was waived on August 30, 2022, and re-signed to the practice squad on September 14. He was promoted to the active roster on September 24, then waived and re-signed back to the practice squad on September 28. He was released on October 4.

New Orleans Saints
On November 16, 2022, Emili was signed to the New Orleans Saints practice squad. He signed a reserve/future contract on January 9, 2023.

References

1998 births
Living people
American football defensive tackles
Penn Quakers football players
Buffalo Bills players
New Orleans Saints players